Carife is a town and comune in the province of Avellino, Campania, Italy. In the year 2001, the population was 1,697.

Located in the Apennines between the Ufita Valley and Daunian Mountains, the town is part of the Roman Catholic Diocese of Ariano Irpino-Lacedonia. Its territory borders the municipalities of Castel Baronia, Frigento, Guardia Lombardi, San Nicola Baronia, Sturno, Trevico and Vallata.

References

Cities and towns in Campania